The Roman Catholic Diocese of Campo Mourão is a suffragan Latin diocese in the Ecclesiastical province of the Metropolitan of Maringá in Paraná state, southern Brazil.

Its cathedral episcopal see is Catedral São José, dedicated to Saint Joseph, in the city of Campo Mourão.

History 
 Established on 20 June 1959 as Diocese of Campo Mourão, on territory split off from the suppressed Territorial Prelature of Foz do Iguaçu
 It lost territories thrice : on 1964.11.28 to establish the Diocese of Apucarana, on 1965.12.16 to establish the Diocese of Guarapuava and on 1973.05.26 to establish the Diocese of Umuarama.

Statistics 
As per 2014, it pastorally served 323,000 Catholics (82.4% of 392,000 total) on 12,187 km² in 39 parishes and a mission with 65 priests (57 diocesan, 8 religious), 5 deacons, 90 lay religious (21 brothers, 69 sisters) and 13 seminarians.

Bishops
(all Roman rite)

Episcopal ordinaries
Suffragan Bishops of Campo Mourão 
 Elizeu Simões Mendes (17 October 1959 - retired 3 December 1980), died 2001; previously Titular Bishop of Nisyrus (1950.08.21 – 1953.09.19) as Auxiliary Bishop of Archdiocese of Fortaleza (Brazil) (1950.08.21 – 1953.09.19), Bishop of Mossoró (Brazil) (1953.09.19 – 1959.10.17)
 Virgílio de Pauli (8 May 1981 - death 21 February 1999)
 Mauro Aparecido dos Santos (21 February 1999 - 31 October 2007), next Archbishop of Archdiocese of Cascavel, Parana (Brazil) (2007.10.31 – ...); previously Coadjutor Bishop of Campo Mourão (1998.05.27 – succession 1999.02.21)
 Francisco Javier Del Valle Paredes (born Paraguay) (24 December 2008 - 6 December 2017)
 Bruno Eliseu Versari (2017.12.06 - ...), previously Coadjutor Bishop of Campo Mourão (2017.04.19 – 2017.12.06), no previous prelature.

Coadjutor bishops
Mauro Aparecido dos Santos (1999-2007)
Bruno Elizeu Versari (2017)

See also 
 List of Catholic dioceses in Brazil

Sources and external links 
 GCatholic.org, with Google map and satellite photo - data for all sections
 Catholic Hierarchy
 Diocese website (Portuguese) 

Roman Catholic dioceses in Brazil
Religious organizations established in 1959
Roman Catholic Ecclesiastical Province of Maringá
Roman Catholic dioceses and prelatures established in the 20th century
Campo Mourão
1959 establishments in Brazil